The 2019 Liga 3 Final wa the final that decided the winner of the 2019 Liga 3, the fifth season of third-tier competition in Indonesia organised by PSSI, and the third season since it was renamed from the Liga Nusantara to the Liga 3 between PSKC and Persijap. The match was played on 29 December 2019 at Pakansari Stadium, Cibinong.

Persijap won the match 3–1 to secure their first title in this competition.

Road to the final

Note: In all scores below, the score of the related team is given first.

Match

References

Liga 3 Final
Liga 3 Final
Liga 3 Final